Dingalan, officially the Municipality of Dingalan, Municipal District of Dingalan, is a 3rd class municipality in the province of Aurora, Philippines. According to the 2020 census, it has a population of 27,878 people.

Dingalan has several caves, of which the Lamao Caves are the best known. The rough shoreline and very high waves of Dingalan makes it attractive to surfers.

History
Dingalan, formerly just a barangay, was created a municipal district within the municipality of Baler in 1956. It was declared a town in 1962.

From November 30 to December 3, 2004, the town was wiped out by the tropical storms Violeta, Winnie, and Yoyong. The town benefited by relief efforts from foreign traders, some Christian groups, La Salle Greenhills, and the Philippine National Red Cross.

Due to its distance from Aurora's capital Baler, Dingalan has been pushing to be included in Nueva Ecija instead since the 1990s. Services from Palayan City, the capital of Nueva Ecija, is closer. Currently, there are no roads that directly connect Dingalan to Baler.

Geography
According to the Philippine Statistics Authority, the municipality has a land area of  constituting  of the  total area of Aurora.

It is bounded on the north by San Luis, west by Gabaldon and General Tinio (Nueva Ecija) and Doña Remedios Trinidad (Bulacan), south by General Nakar (Quezon), and east by the Benham Rise or Plateau and Philippine Sea.

It is a small town with one main cemented road with branching alleys. Further south of the town proper are the barangays of Aplaya, Butas na Bato, Matawe, Ibona, Dikapanikian and Umiray. The premier barangay north of the town is Paltic. All of the barangays are located on the seashore, except for Poblacion and two barangays located in the mountains. The whole town is mountainous due to the Sierra Madre Mountains. The Umiray River separates the town from Quezon Province.

Barangays
Dingalan is politically subdivided into 11 barangays.

Climate

Demographics

In the 2020 census, Dingalan had a population of 27,878.

Economy

Gallery

References

External links

[ Philippine Standard Geographic Code]
Dingalan on Aurora.ph

Municipalities of Aurora (province)